Grishina is a rural locality (a village) in Krasnovishersky District, Perm Krai, Russia. The population was 16 as of 2010. There are 2 streets.

Geography 
Grishina is located 48 km southeast of Krasnovishersk (the district's administrative centre) by road. Verkh-Yazva is the nearest rural locality.

References 

Rural localities in Krasnovishersky District